Barbara G. Walker (born July 2, 1930, in Philadelphia, Pennsylvania) is an American author and feminist. She is a knitting expert and the author of over ten encyclopedic knitting references, despite "not taking to it at all" when she first learned in college. Other topics she has written about are religion, New Age, the occult, spirituality, and mythology.

Books

Knitting
In the 1960s and 1970s, Walker authored several volumes of knitting references which have become landmarks for their comprehensiveness and clarity. Her Knitting Treasury series documents over a thousand different knitting stitches. Other books considered mosaic knitting, for producing multicolored designs while knitting only one color per row, and constructing knitted garments from the top down rather than the usual bottom-up method used in Western knitting tradition. Most of Walker's best-known knitting books have been reprinted, and starting in the mid-1990s, she has published new knitting books.

Feminism and skepticism
Walker writes about the problems with mainstream religion and how these problems have contributed to patriarchal societies and sexism.  In The Skeptical Feminist: Discovering the Virgin, Mother, and Crone, she writes about her belief that there is no god. However, she believes that people, and women in particular, can use the image of the goddess in their day-to-day lives. Walker often uses the imagery of the Mother Goddess to discuss neolithic matriarchies. Her book Woman's Rituals: A Sourcebook is an attempt to show how she puts her "meditation techniques" into practice, and is meant as a guide for other women who wish to do the same.

Criticism
The Woman's Encyclopedia of Myths and Secrets has been criticized for being based on the idea of the "Great Mother" by writers like Robert Graves and Erich Neumann, and for rewriting myths so they would support the theory of a "Great Goddess".

Personal life
Walker studied journalism at the University of Pennsylvania, then worked for the Washington Star in Washington, D.C. While serving on a local hotline helping battered women and pregnant teens in the mid-1970s, she became interested in feminism. Walker continued a personal study of comparative religions and feminist issues after she graduated which led to her writing The Woman's Encyclopedia of Myths and Secrets (1983).

Walker describes herself as an atheist.

She is an advocate of the Christ myth theory.

Awards and recognition
The American Humanist Association named her "Humanist Heroine" in 1993, and in 1995, she received the "Women Making Herstory" award from the New Jersey NOW.

Bibliography

Knitting books
 A Treasury of Knitting Patterns (1968)  (reprint edition 1998)
 A Second Treasury of Knitting Patterns (1970)
 The Craft of Lace Knitting (1971) 
 The Craft of Cable-Stitch Knitting (1971) 
 Knitting from the Top (1972)  (reprint edition)
 The Craft of Multicolor Knitting (1973) 
 Sampler Knitting (1973)  (reprinted in A Fourth Treasury of Knitting Patterns (2000))
 Barbara Walker's Learn-to-Knit Afghan Book (1974)  (reprint edition 1997)
 Mosaic Knitting (1976)  (revised in 1997)
 A Second Treasury of Knitting Patterns (1985)  (reprint edition 1998)
 Charted Knitting Designs: A Third Treasury of Knitting Patterns (1986)  (reprint edition 1998)
 A Fourth Treasury of Knitting Patterns (2000)  (includes Sampler Knitting (1973))
 Mosaic Knitting, Revised (2006)

Neo-pagan feminist works
 The Woman's Encyclopedia of Myths and Secrets (1983) 
 The Secrets of the Tarot: Origins, History, and Symbolism (1984) 
 The I Ching of the Goddess (1986) 
 The Skeptical Feminist: Discovering the Virgin, Mother, and Crone (1987) 
 The Woman's Dictionary of Symbols and Sacred Objects (1988), Castle Books, 
 The Crone: Woman of Age, Wisdom, and Power (1988) 
 The Book of Sacred Stones: Fact and Fallacy in the Crystal World (1989, with Werner P. Brodde) 
 Women's Rituals: A Sourcebook (1990) 
 Restoring the Goddess: Equal Rites for Modern Women (2000) 
 The Essential Handbook of Women's Spirituality and Ritual (2001) 
 Man Made God: A Collection of Essays (2010) 
 Belief and Unbelief (2014)

Novels and short stories
 Amazon: A Novel (1992) 
 Feminist Fairy Tales (1996)

Other works
 Barbara Walker Tarot Deck (Misc. Supplies) (1986) 
 I Ching of the Goddess: Divination Kit (Boxed Set with Cards) (2001) 
 Women And Religion: Sexism In The Christian Tradition (1997) - Freethought Today, January/February 1998.

See also 
 Feminism
 Knitting
 Prehistoric religion
 Skepticism

Notes

References

External links 
 NOW-NJ  National Organization of Women - New Jersey short biography
 Freedom from Religion Foundation short biography
 Walker Treasury Project online community of Walker fans
 The Barbara Walker Knitting Project A community-sourced artist book project by the Tatter Library to knit each entry of Barbara Walker's treasury

1930 births
20th-century American novelists
21st-century American non-fiction writers
20th-century American women writers
21st-century American women writers
20th-century atheists
21st-century atheists
American atheists
American feminist writers
American religious writers
Women religious writers
Atheist feminists
Christ myth theory proponents
Critics of Christianity
Living people
Mythographers
People in knitting
Writers from Philadelphia
Novelists from Pennsylvania
American women non-fiction writers